Trojan Peak is a  mountain summit located along the crest of the Sierra Nevada mountain range in Inyo County, California. It is situated in the John Muir Wilderness, on land managed by Inyo National Forest. Trojan Peak is rankeds as the 16th highest peak in California.

History
The first ascent of the summit was made June 26, 1926, by Norman Clyde, who is credited with 130 first ascents, most of which were in the Sierra Nevada. The peak's name was proposed by Chester Versteeg of the Sierra Club, and officially adopted by the United States Board on Geographic Names in 1951. As the first chairman the Sierra Club's Committee on Geographic Names, Versteeg was responsible for the naming of 250 geographical features in the Sierra Nevada, including Trojan Peak and Lake Helen of Troy, which he named for his alma mater, University of Southern California.

Climate
According to the Köppen climate classification system, Trojan Peak has an alpine climate. Most weather fronts originate in the Pacific Ocean, and travel east toward the Sierra Nevada mountains. As fronts approach, they are forced upward by the peaks, causing them to drop their moisture in the form of rain or snowfall onto the range (orographic lift). Precipitation runoff from this mountain drains east to Owens Valley via George Creek.

See also

 List of mountain peaks of California

References

External links
 Weather forecast: Trojan Peak

Inyo National Forest
Mountains of Inyo County, California
Mountains of the John Muir Wilderness
North American 4000 m summits
Mountains of Northern California
Sierra Nevada (United States)